Sliba-zkha (the name means 'the cross has conquered' in Syriac) was patriarch of the Church of the East from 714 to 728.

Sources 
Brief accounts of Sliba-zkha's patriarchate are given in the Ecclesiastical Chronicle of the Jacobite writer Bar Hebraeus (floruit 1280) and in the ecclesiastical histories of the Nestorian writers Mari ibn Suleiman (twelfth-century), ʿAmr (fourteenth-century) and Sliba (fourteenth-century).  He is also mentioned in an unfavourable anecdote in Thomas of Marga's Book of Governors.

Sliba-zkha's patriarchate 
The following account of Sliba-zkha's patriarchate is given by Bar Hebraeus:

The catholicus Hnanishoʿ was succeeded by Sliba-zkha, who was consecrated at Seleucia.  He was from Karka d'Piroz, which is today called Karkani, in the Tirhan region.  He removed the name of Yohannan Garba ('the Leper') from the diptychs, reconsecrated the bishops consecrated by Garba, and put back the name of Hnanishoʿ, who had been oppressed by calumny, alongside those of the rest of the catholici.  He died after fulfilling his office for fourteen years.

According to ʿAbdishoʿ of Nisibis, Sliba-zkha established metropolitan provinces for Herat, Samarqand, India and China.

See also
 List of patriarchs of the Church of the East

Notes

References
 Abbeloos, J. B., and Lamy, T. J., Bar Hebraeus, Chronicon Ecclesiasticum (3 vols, Paris, 1877)
 Assemani, J. A., De Catholicis seu Patriarchis Chaldaeorum et Nestorianorum (Rome, 1775)
 Brooks, E. W., Eliae Metropolitae Nisibeni Opus Chronologicum (Rome, 1910)
 Gismondi, H., Maris, Amri, et Salibae: De Patriarchis Nestorianorum Commentaria I: Amri et Salibae Textus (Rome, 1896)
 Gismondi, H., Maris, Amri, et Salibae: De Patriarchis Nestorianorum Commentaria II: Maris textus arabicus et versio Latina (Rome, 1899)

External links 

Patriarchs of the Church of the East
8th-century bishops of the Church of the East
728 deaths
8th-century archbishops
Christians from the Umayyad Caliphate
8th-century people from the Umayyad Caliphate